Óscar Emigdio Benítez (born October 6, 1948) is a Salvadoran former professional football player and manager. Benítez became a coach and has spent almost two decades managing several clubs in El Salvador and Honduras.

Playing career
Benítez was born in San Vicente, El Salvador.

Coaching career

El Salvador national team (1991 and 1999–2000)
In 1991, Benítez was named head coach of the El Salvador national team, which he managed at the 1991 UNCAF Nations Cup. His second period as El Salvador's manager began in 1999, and ended one year later. During that time, El Salvador failed to qualify to the 2002 World Cup. He left the national team for Honduran champions Motagua.

Águila
In 1993, Benítez was appointed as coach of C.D. Águila, replacing Juan Quarterone.

Alianza
In 2006, Benítez signed as coach of Alianza F.C., replacing Miguel Mansilla.

Luis Ángel Firpo
In September 2008, Benítez signed as new coach of C.D. Luis Ángel Firpo, replacing Miguel Aguilar Obando. In December of the same year, Benítez was replaced by Agustín Castillo.

Return to Águila
In January 2019, Benítez was appointed as sports director of C.D. Águila.

Administrative roles
Óscar Emigdio Benítez was elected the head of Asociación de Entrenadores de Fútbol de El Salvador (AEFES) from 2011 until he lost the election to Douglas Vidal Jimenez in 2015.
He was re-elected to the head of Asociación de Entrenadores de Fútbol de El Salvador (AEFES) from 2018 until 2020

Coordinator of the El Salvador National football team
Benítez was elected to be the Coordinator of the El Salvador National football team in June 2009. However, after The under 20 was eliminated due to the failure of the right paperwork for the player Dustin Corea.
Benítez resigned due to his part in the scandal.

Honours

Manager

Club
C.D. Municipal Limeño
 Primera División
 Runners-up: Apertura 1999

Real España
 Liga Nacional de Honduras
 Runners-up: 1992

References

External links
 Con El Salvador en la mente, y Limeño en el corazón – El Diario de Hoy 

1948 births
Living people
People from San Vicente, El Salvador
Salvadoran footballers
Salvadoran football managers
C.D. FAS managers
Real C.D. España managers
C.D. Águila managers
F.C. Motagua managers
Municipal Limeño managers
El Salvador national football team managers
C.D. Luis Ángel Firpo managers
Association footballers not categorized by position